Christian Stephen Smith (born 1960) is an American sociologist, currently the William R. Kenan Jr. Professor of Sociology at the University of Notre Dame. Smith's research focuses primarily on religion in modernity, adolescents and emerging adults, sociological theory, philosophy of science, the science of generosity, American evangelicalism, and culture. Smith is well known for his contributions to the sociology of religion, particularly his research into adolescent spirituality, as well as for his contributions to sociological theory and his advocacy of critical realism.

Biography
Smith was born on October 23, 1960. He attended Wheaton College (1978–1979) and received his Bachelor of Arts degree in sociology from Gordon College in 1983. Smith earned his Master of Arts (1987) and Doctor of Philosophy (1990) degrees from Harvard University, where he also spent a year studying theology at Harvard Divinity School. Smith began his academic career as an instructor, and then assistant professor at Gordon College. In 1994 he joined University of North Carolina at Chapel Hill where he was an assistant professor, full professor, and then Stuart Chapin Professor of Sociology. He remained at North Carolina for 12 years before moving to Notre Dame as the William R. Kenan, Jr. Professor of Sociology and Founding Director of the Center for the Study of Religion and Society. He is also a Faculty Fellow of the Kroc Institute for Peace Studies. Smith has been awarded more than $20 million worth of research grants from the Pew Charitable Trusts, Lilly Endowment Inc., the John Templeton Foundation, the Templeton Religion Trust, and other foundations and institutes.

Accolades
Smith received the Notre Dame Graduate Student Union’s Graduate Student Mentoring Award for 2020-2021. The Society for the Scientific Study of Religion granted Smith its Distinguished Book Award, 2018, for his 2017 book, Religion: What it Is, How it Works, and Why it Matters (Princeton).

In 2012, the American Sociological Association section on Altruism, Morality, and Social Solidarity awarded Smith with the Distinguished Career Award.

He was awarded the Lilly Fellows Program Distinguished Book Award in 2011 for his 2009 book, co-authored with Patricia Snell, Souls in Transition: the Religious and Spiritual Lives of Emerging Adults. He was also awarded Christianity Today 2010 Distinguished Book Award for the same book, Souls in Transition. He previously won Christianity Today 2005 Distinguished Book Award for his 2005 book, co-authored with Melinda Lundquist Denton, Soul Searching: the Religious and Spiritual Lives of American Teenagers.

In December, Choice Magazine selected What Is a Person? as one of its Top 25 (out of 7000 reviewed) Outstanding Academic Titles of 2011. The book also received the “Cheryl Frank Memorial Prize for 2010,” from the International Association for Critical Realism.  Smith received for the same book the 2011 Honorable Mention Award for Professional and Scholarly Excellence from American Publisher’s, Philosophy category. 

In 2007, Smith's alma mater, Gordon College, presented him with the "Alumnus of the Year" award in "recognition of his many accomplishments and work as one of the leading Christian sociologists in the country."

Michael Emerson and Smith's Divided by Faith was the winner of the "2001 Outstanding Book Award" from the Society for the Scientific Study of Religion.

Smith was awarded the “Excellence in Teaching and Mentoring, 1995-96” by the Graduate Student Association, Department of Sociology, University of North Carolina at Chapel Hill. This was followed in 2002 by an “Excellence in Mentoring Award, 2001-2002” by the Graduate Student Association, Department of Sociology, University of North Carolina at Chapel Hill.

Smith was co-author with Mark Regnerus on the 1999 "Outstanding Article Award", granted by the American Sociological Association Section on the Sociology of Religion, for "Selective Deprivatization Among American Religious Traditions: The Reversal of the Great Reversal", published in Social Forces.

Moralistic therapeutic deism
In his 2005 book Soul Searching: The Religious and Spiritual Lives of American Teenagers co-written with  Melinda Lundquist Denton, he introduced the term moralistic therapeutic deism (abbreviated MTD) to describe the common religious beliefs exhibited by American youth in a survey. It has also been referred to as egonovism. The book summarized the "National Study of Youth and Religion", privately funded by the Lilly Endowment.

They label moralistic therapeutic deism as a religion with the following traits:

Critical realism
Critical realism (CR) is, in Smith's view, the most promising general approach to social science for best framing our research and theory. CR, as a philosophy of (social) science (not a sociological theory per se), offers the best alternative to the problems and limits presented by positivist empiricism, hermeneutical interpretivism, strong social constructionism, and postmodernist deconstruction. It is the meta-theoretical direction in which American sociology needs to move

Smith's work in CR involves What is a Person? Rethinking Humanity, Social Life, and the Moral Good from the Person Up (Chicago 2010) (with Moral, Believing Animals (OUP 2003) forming a pre-CR theoretical backdrop); To Flourish or Destruct: A Personalist Theory of Human Goods, Motivations, Failure, and Evil (Chicago 2014), and Religion: What it Is, How it Works, and Why it Matters (Princeton 2017).Published works

Smith is author, co-author, and editor of numerous scholarly books, articles, book chapters, book reviews, and research reports. A selection of Smith's books includes:Handing Down the Faith: How Parents Pass Their Religion on to the Next Generation (2021) (Oxford). Religious Parenting: Transmitting Faith and Values in Contemporary America (with Bridget Ritz and Michael Rotolo) (2019) (Princeton)Religion: What it Is, How it Works, and Why it Matters (2017) (Princeton)To Flourish or Destruct: A Personalist Theory of Human Goods, Motivations, Failure, and Evil (2015) (Chicago)The Sacred Project of American Sociology (2014) (Oxford University Press)The Bible Made Impossible: Why Biblicism Is Not a Truly Evangelical Reading of Scripture (2011) (Brazos)How to Go From Being a Good Evangelical to a Committed Catholic in 95 Difficult Steps (2011) (Cascade)Lost in Transition: The Dark Side of Emerging Adulthood (2011) (Oxford)What Is a Person?: Rethinking Humanity, Social Life, and the Moral Good from the Person Up (2010) (Chicago)Passing the Plate: Why American Christians Do Not Give Away More Money (2008) (Oxford)Souls in Transition: The Religious and Spiritual Lives of Emerging Adults (2009), with Patricia Snell (Oxford)Soul Searching: the Religious and Spiritual Lives of American Teenagers (2005), with Melinda Lundquist Denton (Oxford)Moral, Believing Animals: Human Personhood and Culture (2003) (Oxford)The Secular Revolution (2003) (California)Christian America?: What Evangelicals Really Want (2000) (California)Divided by Faith: Evangelical Religion and the Problem of Race in America (2000), with Michael Emerson (Oxford)American Evangelicalism: Embattled and Thriving (1998), with Michael Emerson, Sally Gallagher, Paul Kennedy, and David Sikkink (Chicago)Resisting Reagan: The U.S. Central America Peace Movement (1996) (Chicago)The Emergence of Liberation Theology: Radical Religion and Social Movement Theory'' (1991) (Chicago)

References

External links
 
 Christian Smith's CV
 National Study of Youth and Religion
 Science of Generosity

1960 births
20th-century social scientists
21st-century social scientists
American religion academics
American sociologists
Gordon College (Massachusetts) alumni
Gordon College (Massachusetts) faculty
Harvard University alumni
Living people
Sociologists of religion
Sociology of culture
University of North Carolina at Chapel Hill faculty
University of Notre Dame faculty